This is a list of members of the Victorian Legislative Council from the elections of 24 August to 10 December 1870 to the elections of 24 August to September 1872.

There were six Electoral Provinces and five members elected to each Province.

Note the "Term in Office" refers to that members term(s) in the Council, not necessarily for that Province.

William Mitchell was President of the Council, Robert Hope was Chairman of Committees.

 Pettet (sometimes spelt Pettett) died 2 December 1871, replaced by Thomas Hamilton in April 1872
 Walsh resigned in May 1871, replaced by Archibald Michie in a June 1871 by-election (sworn in August)

References

 Re-member (a database of all Victorian MPs since 1851). Parliament of Victoria.

Members of the Parliament of Victoria by term
19th-century Australian politicians